Mane or Mané is a surname. Notable people with the surname include:

Ansumane Mané (1940–2000), Guinea-Bissau soldier
Carlos Mané (born 1994), Portuguese footballer
Gucci Mane (born 1980), American rapper; birth name Radric Davis
Emmanuel Mane-Katz (1894–1962), Ukrainian painter
Laxman Mane (born 1949), Indian writer and a social activist 
Malick Mané (born 1988), Senegalese football player 
Nivedita Sambhajirao Mane (born 1963), Indian politician
Purnima Mane, Indian public health worker
Sadio Mané (born 1992), Senegalese footballer 
Sureshbabu Mane (1902–1953), Indian singer
Tyler Mane (born 1966), Canadian actor and professional wrestler
Vinayak Mane (born 1982), Indian cricketer